Stampede is the second studio album by American heavy metal supergroup Hellyeah, released on July 13, 2010. It debuted at No. 8 on the Billboard 200, making it the band's highest-charted album to date. Stampede is the first Hellyeah album to feature bassist Bob Zilla.

The music video for "Cowboy Way" premiered on May 20, 2010. The first single, "Hell of a Time", was released on June 1, 2010. The music video for "Hell of a Time" premiered on June 16, 2010. The song "The Debt That All Men Pay" premiered on ultimate-guitar.com on June 22, 2010.

Track listing

Charts

Personnel
Chad Gray – vocals
Greg Tribbett – lead guitar
Tom Maxwell – rhythm guitar
Bob Zilla – bass
Vinnie Paul – drums

References

2010 albums
Hellyeah albums
Epic Records albums